Eupithecia subumbrata, the shaded pug, is a moth of the family Geometridae. The species was first described by Michael Denis and Ignaz Schiffermüller in 1775. It is found from Mongolia and the Altai Mountains through Siberia, central Asia, Asia Minor and Russia to western Europe and from central Scandinavia to the Mediterranean region.

The wingspan is 18–21 mm. The ground colour is white relatively conspicuously patterned with greyish-brown transverse lines on the forewings. See also Prout   
The larva is long and slender, either light brown or green, with scattered, small, white warts.

This species is preferably found in slightly damp, grassy areas, including coastal meadows.

There is one generation per year with adults on wing from the beginning of May to August.

The larvae feed are polyphagous and feed on various plants, including Galium mollugo, Hypericum perforatum, Pimpinella, Senecio and Solidago species. Larvae can be found from July to September. It overwinters as a pupa.

Subspecies
Eupithecia subumbrata subumbrata
Eupithecia subumbrata iliata Schutze, 1956 (Kazakhstan, Kyrghyzstan)

References

External links
Shaded pug at UKMoths
Lepiforum e.V.

Moths described in 1775
subumbrata
Moths of Europe
Moths of Asia
Taxa named by Michael Denis
Taxa named by Ignaz Schiffermüller